Kanske en gentleman (Perhaps a Gentleman) is a Swedish drama film from 1935 directed by Ragnar Arvedson and Tancred Ibsen. The film script was written by Theodor Berthels, Berndt Carlberg (pseudonym Berco), and Ulla Kåge. It was base on George Bernard Shaw's play Pygmalion.

The play also served as the basis for Anthony Asquith's and Leslie Howard's British film Pygmalion in 1938 and the musical My Fair Lady, which was filmed in the United States by George Cukor in 1964. The two Swedish films Kanske en gentleman (1950) and Fly mej en greve'' (1959) are also based on the play.

The film had its Swedish premiere on August 24, 1935 at the Astoria cinema in Stockholm.

Cast
Adolf Jahr as Gustaf "Gurra" Lind, a dock worker
Carl Barcklind as company director Hugo Berner
Olga Andersson as Sofia Berner, his wife
Brita Appelgren as Vera Berner, his daughter
Frank Sundström a Erik Berner, his son
Ivar Kåge as Olof Mellgren, a doctor and friend of the Berner family 
Einar Axelsson as Baron Lejonsvan
Maj Törnblad as Brita Olsson, an office girl at Berner's office
Margit Andelius as Miss Höst, an office manager at Berner's office
Aino Taube as Lisa, Berner's maid 
Ragnar Widestedt as a private detective 
Axel Högel as a workshop owner, Gurra's friend 
Torsten Winge as Rosenblom, a hairdresser 
Sture Baude as Persson, a pawnbroker 
Ernst Brunman as a port worker at Stadsgården / a man at the beer café

References

External links

Kanske en gentleman at the Swedish Film Database

Swedish romantic drama films
1935 drama films
Swedish black-and-white films
Films directed by Tancred Ibsen